Intelligent documents are electronic documents with more functionality than a page designed to emulate paper.  Formats include PDF from Adobe, InfoPath from Microsoft, and XForms from W3C. Each is based on using XML as a format for data.

Intelligent documents are essentially interactive electronic documents.  Intelligent documents include forms that change on request, personalized web pages, and personalised presentations.  They usually require web access and server software.

Intelligent documents are used to help automate business processes, improve customer service, and reduce costs.  Intelligent documents are also being used by marketing firms to target consumers more precisely.  Programming marketing documents with customer data helps to improve customer loyalty, increase response rates, reduce marketing costs, and build brand recognition.

Some examples would be online shopping sites or free email services which usually use AJAX technology to add "intelligence" to its documents.  Other more document-centric examples include commercial lending or leasing documents where, by the transactional nature, they can be automated using an assembly line approach with the logic and data embedded directly into the document.

The future of the intelligent document includes tight integration with "meaning-based computing", allowing intelligent completion of forms with recommendations on subject-matter experts and related documents as well as dynamic regeneration based on rules or logic.

Today's more advanced document automation systems allow users to create their own data and rules (logic) without the need for programming.

See also
 Business intelligence
 Document automation

External links
 Gilbane Report
 XML 2003 report

Electronic documents